Michael O'Loughlin (born 14 February 1997 in Carrick-on-Suir) is an Irish cyclist, who currently rides for UCI Continental team .

Major results

2014
 National Junior Road Championships
2nd Road race
2nd Time trial
 8th Time trial, UCI Junior Road World Championships
2015
 1st  Road race, National Junior Road Championships
2016
 National Road Championships
1st  Under-23 road race
3rd Under-23 time trial
3rd Road race
4th Time trial
2017
 National Road Championships
1st  Under-23 road race
1st  Under-23 time trial
4th Time trial
 8th Overall An Post Rás
1st  Young rider classification
2018
 National Road Championships
1st  Under-23 time trial
3rd Under-23 road race
4th Road race
2019
 1st  Time trial, National Under-23 Road Championships
 6th Time trial, European Games

References

External links

1997 births
Living people
Irish male cyclists
Cyclists at the 2019 European Games
European Games competitors for Ireland
Sportspeople from County Tipperary